Tengako is a peninsula at the north end of Fongafale islet of Funafuti, Tuvalu. At the end of the peninsula is Amatuku islet on which the Tuvalu Maritime Training Institute is located.

See also

References

Landforms of Tuvalu
Funafuti
Peninsulas of Oceania